Émilie is a French female given name. It is the feminine form of the male name Émile. Spelled Emilie, it is used internationally.

People named Émilie
Émilie Bigottini (1784–1858), French dancer of Italian ancestry
Émilie Bonnivard (born 1980), French politician
Émilie Marie Bouchaud aka Polaire (1874–1939), French singer and actress
Émilie Charmy (1878–1974), artist in France's early avant-garde
Émilie Deleuze (born 1964), French film director and screenwriter
Émilie Dequenne (born 1981), Belgian actress
Émilie Dionne, quintuplet
Émilie du Châtelet (1706–1749), French mathematician, physicist and author
Émilie Fer (born 1983), French slalom canoeist
Émilie Gamelin (1800–1851), Canadian social worker and Roman Catholic nun
Émilie Gomis (born 1983), French -Senegalese professional basketball player
Émilie Heymans (born 1981), Canadian diver
Émilie Le Pennec (born 1987), French gymnast
Émilie Loit (born 1979), retired French professional female tennis player
Émilie Mannering, Canadian filmmaker
Émilie Mondor (1981–2006), Canadian Olympic athlete
Émilie Tran Nguyen (born 1985), French journalist
Émilie Simon (born 1978), singer and composer of electronic music
Émilie Louise Marie Françoise Joséphine Pellapra (1806–1871), possibly an illegitimate daughter of Napoleon I by Françoise-Marie LeRoy
Émilie Vina (born 1982), French cross-country skier
Marie Émilie Thérèse de Joly de Choin (1670–1732), the morganatic spouse of Louis, Dauphin of France

People named Emilie
 Emilie Autumn, American musician
 Emilie Bergbom, theatre director
 Émilie Chandler (born 1983), French politician
 Emilie Davis (1839-1889), American diarist
 Emilie da Fonseca, opera singer
 Emilie de Ravin (born 1981), Australian actress
 Emilie Virginia Haynsworth (1916–1985), American mathematician
 Emilie Haavi, Norwegian footballer
 Emilie Hammarskjöld (1821–1854), composer
 Emilie Högquist (1812–1846), actress
 Emilie Kahn, Canadian musician
 Emilie Mechelin, Finnish opera singer
 Emilie Rathou, temperance and feminist activist
 Emilie Risberg, Swedish novelist and educator
 Emilie Rosing (1783–1811), chorist, stage artist
 Emilie Schindler (1907–2002), humanitarian

See also
Emily (given name)
Émilie (opera), opera by Finnish composer Kaija Saariaho
Emilie (steamboat)
Les Filles de Caleb, original name of a Québec TV show, broadcast and marketed as Emilie for English audiences as well as Émilie, la passion d'une vie outside of Québec

French feminine given names